K. O. Aysha Bai (25 October 1926 – 28 October 2005), also spelled Ayesha Bai, was a Communist politician from south India. She was the first Deputy Speaker of the Kerala Legislative Assembly (6 May 1957 – 31 July 1959). Aysha Bai was the first Muslim woman to rise to public fame in modern Kerala. She was an aggressive advocate for the forward progress of Mappila women. She was also a pioneer organizer of Women's Societies (Mahila Samajams).

Bai had her education at Women's College and University College, Trivandrum and Law College, Ernakulam (B. A. and B. L.). She participated in the Students Congress in 1947.

Bai joined the Communist Party of India (CPI) in 1953 and was elected as representative from Kayamkulam Constituency to the Kerala Legislative Assembly in 1957, serving two terms (in first and second KLAs). She served as Deputy Speaker of the Assembly from May 1957 until July 1959. She served as Chairman of the Committee on Government Assurances from 1961 to 1963. She was State Vice President, Kerala Mahila Sangham – Communist Party of India, Member, Central and State Social Welfare Boards and State Watch – Dog Committee on Prisons.

Bai was born to K. Usman Sahib and  Fathima Beevi. She was married to K. Abdul Razzak and they have two daughters and two sons.

References 

Communist Party of India politicians from Kerala
1926 births
Indian women activists
Indian women's rights activists
20th-century Indian women politicians
20th-century Indian politicians
Malayali politicians
2005 deaths
Kerala MLAs 1957–1959
Kerala MLAs 1960–1964
Deputy Speakers of the Kerala Legislative Assembly
Women members of the Kerala Legislative Assembly